Four of Cups is a Minor Arcana tarot card.

Tarot cards are used throughout much of Europe to play Tarot card games.

In English-speaking countries, where the games are largely unknown, Tarot cards came to be utilized primarily for divinatory purposes; the unconscious finds meaning and fulfillment in the Tarot's images and symbols.

References

Suit of Cups